Number One Beautiful is the debut EP from On Broken Wings, released in 2001.

Track listing
"I Do My Crosswords In Pen" - 03:16
"Deep Six" - 02:48
"Tether" - 04:10
"I Hope You Don't Get Raped In Cancun" - 04:15
"My Life, Your Movie" - 04:13
"Lovesick" - 06:13

Members
Jonathan Blake - Voice
Mike McMillen - Guitar
Sean Laforce - Guitar
"Chuck" Lombardo - Bass
Johnny Earle - Samples/Keyboard
Kevin Garvin - Drums

Credits
Andrew Schneider - Producer/Mixing
Nick Zampiello - Mastering

On Broken Wings albums
2003 albums